Koligarh also spelled Koligad and Koligadh is a castle in Basrambu Patti of Garhwal in Uttarakhand, India. This is the one of the fifty two castles of Garhwal. It was ruled by Koli chieftain Jhagad Singh Negi who was its last ruler because he was defeated by first ruler of Garhwal Kingdom Ajay Pal and annexed in it.

See also 

 Koliwara

References 

Castles in India